Noarlunga Downs is a metropolitan suburb of Adelaide, South Australia. It lies within the City of Onkaparinga and has postcode 5168.

The suburb is the home of Hickinbotham Oval, the home ground of the South Adelaide Football Club who play in the South Australian National Football League (SANFL). The oval was officially opened as Noarlunga Oval in 1995. It has a spectator capacity of 12,000 and includes television standard lights for night games. The Panthers Club also houses entertainment, bar, gaming and restaurant facilities.

History

See also
Noarlunga (disambiguation)
Onkaparinga River Recreation Park

References

Suburbs of Adelaide